SCRIPDB is a database of chemical structures  associated to patents.

References

External links
 http://dcv.uhnres.utoronto.ca/SCRIPDB.

Biological databases
Patent law
Public records